Cypasis or Kypasis was an Emporium of the Cardia, on the east of the Hebrus River, on the Bay of Melas.

References

Populated places in ancient Thrace
Former populated places in Turkey
History of Çanakkale Province